Raphael Ntimane (born 18 April 1984) is a Swaziland international footballer who plays as a defender. As of January 2010, he plays for Malanti Chiefs in the Swazi Premier League and has won 11 caps for his country.

External links

1984 births
Living people
Swazi footballers
Eswatini international footballers

Association footballers not categorized by position